The 2021 European Open was a men's tennis tournament played on indoor hard courts. It was the sixth edition of the European Open and part of the ATP Tour 250 series of the 2021 ATP Tour. It took place at the Lotto Arena in Antwerp, Belgium, from 18 October until 24 October 2021.

Finals

Singles 

  Jannik Sinner defeated  Diego Schwartzman, 6–2, 6–2

Doubles 

  Nicolas Mahut /  Fabrice Martin defeated  Wesley Koolhof /  Jean-Julien Rojer, 6–0, 6–1

Singles main-draw entrants

Seeds

 Rankings are as of 4 October 2021.

Other entrants
The following players received wildcards into the singles main draw:
  Zizou Bergs
  Richard Gasquet
  Andy Murray

The following players received entry from the qualifying draw:
  Jenson Brooksby 
  Henri Laaksonen 
  Brandon Nakashima
  Dennis Novak

Withdrawals
Before the tournament
  Félix Auger-Aliassime → replaced by  Alexei Popyrin
  Nikoloz Basilashvili → replaced by  Gianluca Mager
  Pablo Carreño Busta → replaced by  Jordan Thompson
  Grigor Dimitrov → replaced by  Arthur Rinderknech
  Fabio Fognini → replaced by  Lorenzo Musetti
  Ugo Humbert → replaced by  Jan-Lennard Struff
  Cameron Norrie → replaced by  Botic van de Zandschulp

Doubles main-draw entrants

Seeds

 Rankings are as of 4 October 2021.

Other entrants
The following pairs received wildcards into the doubles main draw:
  Ruben Bemelmans /  Kimmer Coppejans 
  Lloyd Harris /  Xavier Malisse

Withdrawals
Before the tournament
  Simone Bolelli /  Máximo González → replaced by  David Pel /  Botic van de Zandschulp
  Grigor Dimitrov /  Frederik Nielsen → replaced by  Frederik Nielsen /  Matej Sabanov
  Fabio Fognini /  Roman Jebavý → replaced by  Roman Jebavý /  Andrei Vasilevski
  Cristian Garín /  David Vega Hernández → replaced by  Federico Delbonis /  David Vega Hernández
  Nikola Mektić /  Mate Pavić → replaced by  Jonathan Erlich /  André Göransson
  John Peers /  Filip Polášek → replaced by  Romain Arneodo /  Matt Reid
  Tim Pütz /  Michael Venus → replaced by  Denys Molchanov /  Aleksandr Nedovyesov

During the tournament
  Lorenzo Musetti /  Benoît Paire

References

External links 
 

2021
European Open
European Open
European Open